Sivasakthi is a 1996 Indian Tamil-language crime film directed by Suresh Krissna. The film stars Sathyaraj, Prabhu and Rambha. It was released on 6 September 1996.

Plot 

Marc Zuber Antony, alias Tony (Mahesh Anand), an international smuggler, ended up on an isolated island after killing some navy officers. He decided to hide his merchandises there, and he threatened the people of the island. In the process, Tony killed the island's school teacher (Girish Karnad) in front of his wife, his son Siva and his daughter Priya.

Many years later, Siva (Sathyaraj) becomes a rich man in the city and lives with his sister Priya (Rambha) and his mother (Sujatha). Siva is haunted by his father's murder, and he tries to take revenge with the help of his friend Anbu (Nizhalgal Ravi). In the meantime, Priya falls in love with a happy-go-lucky man Sakthi (Prabhu). Later, Siva appoints Sakthi, and he becomes his best friend.

One day, Siva kills in front of his mother Tony's henchman, and he reveals to his mother that he is, in fact, a smuggler. Shocked after hearing this, his mother and his sister Priya leave his house, and they decide to move into Sakthi's house.

Actually, Sakthi is an undercover police officer who tries to arrest Siva. Tony was supposed to be dead, according to the police report, but Sakthi finds out that he is not dead. The rest of the story is about what happens to Siva, Sakthi, Priya and Tony.

Cast 

Sathyaraj as Siva
Prabhu as Sakthi
Rambha as Priya
Sujatha as Siva's mother
Mahesh Anand as Marc Zuber Antony alias Tony
Nizhalgal Ravi as Anbu
Girish Karnad as Siva's father
Ragasudha as Vandana
K. S. Jayalakshmi as Kameswari
R. N. K. Prasad as R. N. K. Prasad
Jaya Prahasam as Gaja
Mohan V. Ram
Devayani in a guest appearance

Soundtrack 
The music was composed by Deva, with lyrics written by Vairamuthu.

Reception 
R. P. Aa. of Kalki said .

References

External links 
 

1990s Tamil-language films
1996 crime films
1996 films
Films directed by Suresh Krissna
Films scored by Deva (composer)
Indian crime films
Indian films about revenge